Ville-Marie is a town on Lake Temiscaming in western Quebec, Canada. It is the largest city and seat of the Témiscamingue Regional County Municipality. As one of the oldest towns in the Abitibi-Témiscamingue region, it is considered the cradle of north-western Quebec and nicknamed "Pearl of Témiscamingue".

CKVM-FM broadcasts from Ville-Marie.  The town is home to the Junior "A" Ville-Marie Pirates of the Greater Metro Junior A Hockey League.

History
Already in 1679, the place functioned as a trading post between the French and indigenous Algonquians. In 1720, the North West Company opened a trading post and built a store in 1785, which came into the hands of the Hudson's Bay Company in 1821 when the two companies merged. In 1836, a mission was established, followed in 1863, by a mission founded by the Missionary Oblates of Mary Immaculate, who gave it the name "Ville-Marie".

Originally the area was called Kelly Bay in honour of its first settler, James Kelly, who lived as a hermit. In 1874, Oblate missionary Joseph Moffet (1852–1932) cleared some land and moved to Kelly Bay that came to be known as Baie-des-Pères (Bay of Fathers). In 1883, he was joined by a group of settlers from Nicolet. In 1886, the Parish of Notre-Dame-du-Saint-Rosaire-de-Ville-Marie was founded, and in 1891, the Baie-des-Père Post Office opened. The Village Municipality of Ville-Marie was incorporated in 1897 and the following year the post office was renamed to match the village's name. In 1899, the HBC post closed.

On December 22, 1962, the Village Municipality of Ville-Marie became the Town of Ville-Marie.

Ville-Marie is the seat of the judicial district of Témiscamingue.

Demographics 

Population trend:
 Population in 2021: 2,464
 Population in 2016: 2,584
 Population in 2011: 2,595
 Population in 2006: 2,696
 Population in 2001: 2,770
 Population in 1996: 2,855
 Population in 1991: 2,581

Languages
Mother tongue:
 English as first language: 0.6%
 French as first language: 98.1%
 English and French as first language: 0.4%
 Other as first language: 1.0%

Climate
Ville-Marie presents a typical continental climate, with frigid winters alongside warm and humid summers. It benefits from the lake's influence in winter, when temperatures are significantly higher than in other towns further from the lake.

Economy
The main components of the local economy are agriculture, forestry, hydro-electricity, outdoor tourism (hunting and sport fishing).

See also
 List of towns in Quebec

References

External links

 Ville-Marie official website

Cities and towns in Quebec
Incorporated places in Abitibi-Témiscamingue
Hudson's Bay Company trading posts
Catholic missions of New France
Témiscamingue Regional County Municipality